Wanxiu District is a district of the city of Wuzhou, Guangxi, China, bordering Guangdong province to the southeast.

County-level divisions of Guangxi
Wuzhou